Everyone's Out to Get Me is the second studio album by rock band Get Scared, released on November 11, 2013. It's also the first release under their new label Fearless Records. The album was produced by Erik Ron who also produced the bands EP Built for Blame, Laced With Shame, and has worked with bands such as, Panic! at the Disco, Foxy Shazam, Attaloss, Saosin, Allstar Weekend, and many more. Alternative Press had streamed their new album online on November 7. It is the first release from the band to feature original vocalist Nicholas Matthews since his departure in 2011 and return in late 2012; it is also the first to feature new rhythm guitarist Adam Virostko. The album debuted at No. 1 on the Billboard Heatseekers, selling 3,000 copies in the first week.

Track listing

Personnel
Get Scared
 Nicholas Matthews - Lead vocals
 Jonathan "Johnny B" Braddock - Lead guitar, backing vocals
 Bradley "Lloyd" Iverson - Bass, backing vocals
 Dan Juarez - Drums, percussion
 Adam Virostko - Rhythm guitar

Additional
 Erik Ron - producer
 Ronnie Radke - co-writing on "For You"

References

External links
http://fearlessrecords.com/releases/view/166&page=

Get Scared albums
2013 albums